The 1960 Swedish speedway season was the 1960 season of motorcycle speedway in Sweden.

Individual

Individual Championship
The 1960 Swedish Individual Speedway Championship final was held on 30 September in Stockholm. Ove Fundin won the Swedish Championship for the third time.

Swedish Junior Championship
 
Winner - Willihard Thomsson

Team

Team Championship
Vargarna won division 1 and were declared the winners of the Swedish Speedway Team Championship for the fifth time. The Vargarna team contained Olle Nygren, Joel Jansson, Björn Knutsson and Per-Tage Svensson.

Filbyterna won the second division. Älgarna did not compete during 1960.

See also 
 Speedway in Sweden

References

Speedway leagues
Professional sports leagues in Sweden
Swedish
Seasons in Swedish speedway